Lelak is an extinct language of Malaysian Borneo. The Lelak people now speak Berawan.

References

Berawan–Lower Baram languages
Languages of Malaysia
Extinct languages of Asia